Central Singapore may refer to:
Central Singapore Community Development Council
Central Region, Singapore
Central Area, Singapore